KZBB (97.9 FM) is a commercial radio station in Poteau, Oklahoma, broadcasting to the Fort Smith, Arkansas, area.  KZBB airs a hot adult contemporary music format. Before it rebrand back to its B-98 name, it was known as The Zebra 97.9, and had a Mainstream Rock format beginning in the mid-1990s.

History
KZBB is formerly known as "B-98", airing a CHR format beginning from 1986 until 1992. In 1992, the station became an adult contemporary format known as “Star 98”, and then rock a few years later, initially as “Red Hot Radio 97.9, Star 98”, and later as “Zebra 98.”  In October 1997, KZBB flipped back to Top 40 and rebranded back to its former "B98" name.

Former logo

References

External links
KZBB official website

ZBB
Hot adult contemporary radio stations in the United States
Radio stations established in 1967
IHeartMedia radio stations